The Himara Revolt, was a Greek uprising during the First Balkan War that took place in the region of Himara (Himarë, today southern Albania), on  . It successfully overthrew the Ottoman forces of the region, thus securing the coastal area between Sarandë and Vlorë for the Hellenic Army.

Background
During the First Balkan War (1912-1913), the Epirus front was of secondary importance for Greece after the Macedonian front. The landing in Himara, in the rear of the Ottoman Army was planned as an independent operation from the rest of the Epirus front. Its aim was to secure the advance of the Greek forces to the northern regions of Epirus. The success of such an initiative was primarily based on the superiority of the Greek navy in the Ionian Sea and the decisive support of the local Greek population.

At early October 1912, Gendarmerie Major Spyros Spyromilios, a native of Himara, moved to the Greek island Corfu, opposite Himara. His mission was to organize groups of volunteers consisting of northern Epirus Greeks. He also received orders from the Greek government to communicate with the local Albanian beys of the surrounding regions. This unit was later reinforced by additional 200 Greek volunteers from Crete (Cretan commanders Galeros, Papagiannakis and Polixigis) sent by General Konstantinos Sapountzakis, commander of the Greek army in Epirus front.

Conflicts

End of Ottoman rule

On November 15, urgent orders were received from the headquarters of the Hellenic Army for the immediate landing in the region of Himara. The landing operation began at 07:30 am of November 18, at the bay of Spilia near the town of Himara. The disembarking volunteer force did not face any resistance. Immediately it was divided into two groups: The first group which consisted of local volunteers approached the town of Himara from the north, while the second group consisting of Cretans approached from the opposite direction. As soon as the first group entered the town it came under fire from the headquarters of the local Ottoman administration, where the Ottoman guard was garrisoned. Finally, after the arrival of the second group, a brief clash occurred which ended up with the surrender of the Ottomans.

Immediately, after the town was secured, the head of the volunteer force, Spyros Spyromilios, raised the Greek flag in the former Ottoman headquarters, thus marking the end of the Ottoman administration.

As soon as the news spread about the successful operation of the Greek force, armed inhabitants from the surrounding villages: Drymades, Kiparo, Palasa, Kudesi, Vouno appeared in Himara, declaring to Spyromilios that they will support him in his movement for the incorporation of the rest of the Ottoman-controlled Epirus into Greece.

Securing the region
In order to secure the control of the region against a possible counterattack, Spyromilios ordered the Cretan units to move immediately to the strategic location of the Llogara Pass. The pass was located northwest of Himara and towards the direction of Vlore. Upon advancing to their new positions, the Cretan groups realized that a number of Ottoman Albanian irregulars were stationed there, while an attempt to push them out, in November 24, was unsuccessful.

Spyromilios also suggested to the Greek Prime Minister Eleftherios Venizelos that the coastal city of Vlorë should come under Greek control but the latter responded negatively in fear that this might trigger Italian military intervention.

Albanian attacks against Himara were initiated after the Albanian Declaration of Independence in Vlorë, on November 28. Nevertheless, the defenders managed to repel them and the area remained under Greek control until the end of the Balkan Wars. In one occasion when the Greek headquarters expected full-scale attack in the area it ordered Spyromilios to retreat, however he rejected the order and remained in the region successfully organizing the local defence.

Aftermath
Under the terms of the Protocol of Florence, signed on December 17, 1913, the region of Northern Epirus, in which Himarë was part was awarded to Albania. This decision triggered a series of events that lead to the proclamation of the Autonomous Republic of Northern Epirus in Argyrokastro by the local Greek population.

References

Sources

External links
 Μεγάλη Στρατιωτική και Ναυτική Εγκυκλοπαιδεία (in Greek).

Conflicts in 1912
Greek rebellions against the Ottoman Empire
Battles of the First Balkan War
Military history of Albania
History of Vlorë County
Janina vilayet
Himara
Modern history of Epirus
Amphibious operations
November 1912 events